Radclyffe (real name Dr. Lenora Ruth Barot, born 1950) is an American author of lesbian romance, paranormal romance, erotica, and mystery. She has authored multiple short stories, written fan fiction, and edited numerous anthologies. Radclyffe is a member of the Saints and Sinners Literary Hall of Fame and has won numerous literary awards, including the RWA/GDRWA Booksellers' Best award, the RWA/Orange County Book Buyers Best award, the RWA/New England Bean Pot award, the RWA/VCRW Laurel Wreath award, the RWA/FTHRW Lories award, the RWA/HODRW Aspen Gold award, the RWA Prism award, the Golden Crown Literary Award, and the Lambda Literary Award. She is a 2003/04 recipient of The Alice B Readers Award for her body of work as well as a member of the Golden Crown Literary Society, Pink Ink, and the Romance Writers of America. In 2014, the Lambda Literary Foundation awarded Barot with the Dr. James Duggins Outstanding Mid-Career Novelist award acknowledging her as an established author with a strong following and the promise of future high-quality work. In 2015 she was a featured author in the award-winning documentary film about the romance writing and reading community, Love Between the Covers, from Blueberry Hill Productions. In 2019 she was named a Trailblazer in Romance by the Romance Writers of America, for her works of LGBTQ+ fiction. In 2021, she was named one of The Advocate's Women of the Year.

Barot founded the independent LGBTQ+ publishing company Bold Strokes Books in 2004, whose mission is to publish quality works of LGBTQ+ fiction and to create visibility and opportunities for own-voices authors. She has given many workshops on the craft of writing, and in 2013, she founded the Flax Mill Creek Writers Retreat where she offers both face-to-face and online workshops to authors at all stages of development.

She lives with her partner, Rensselaer Polytechnic Institute professor Dr. Lee Ligon, in Johnsonville, New York.

She is a double-boarded General/Plastic and Reconstructive surgeon who retired from medicine in 2004 to devote herself full-time to writing and publishing. Barot chooses not to type, instead using speech recognition software to write her books.

Early life and education
Barot was valedictorian of the June 1968 graduating class of Hudson Falls High School in Hudson Falls, New York, after which she attended the State University of New York at Albany.

Barot graduated from the University of Pennsylvania School of Medicine in 1976.

Literary Awards and Honors

Works 

The Provincetown Tales

 Safe Harbor
 Beyond the Breakwater 
 Distant Shores, Silent Thunder 
 Storms of Change
 Winds of Fortune 
 Returning Tides 
 Sheltering Dunes 
 Treacherous Seas

PMC Hospital Romances

 Passion’s Bright Fury (prequel) 
 Fated Love
 Night Call 
 Crossroads
 Passionate Rivals 
 Unrivaled 
 Perfect Rivalry

Rivers Community Romances

 Against Doctor’s Orders 
 Prescription for Love 
 Love on Call 
 Love After Hours
 Love to the Rescue 
 Love on the Night Shift 
 Pathway to Love

Honor Series

 Above All, Honor
 Honor Bound
 Love & Honor
 Honor Guards
 Honor Reclaimed
 Honor Under Siege
 Word of Honor
 Oath of Honor (crossover with First Responders Novels)
 Code of Honor
 Price of Honor
 Cost of Honor

Justice Series

 A Matter of Trust (prequel)
 Shield of Justice
 In Pursuit of Justice
 Justice in the Shadows 
 Justice Served 
 Justice for All

First Responders Novels

 Trauma Alert 
 Firestorm 
 Taking Fire
 Wild Shores 
 Heart Stop 
 Dangerous Waters

Romances
 Innocent Hearts 
 Promising Hearts 
 Love’s Melody Lost 
 Love’s Tender Warriors 
 Tomorrow’s Promise 
 Love’s Masquerade 
 shadowland
 Turn Back Time
 When Dreams Tremble 
 The Lonely Hearts Club 
 Secrets in the Stone 
 Desire by Starlight 
 Homestead
 The Color of Love 
 Secret Hearts
 Only This Summer (forthcoming, 2022)

Short Fiction
 Collected Stories by Radclyffe
 Erotic Interludes: Change Of Pace 
 Radical Encounters

 Stacia Seaman and Radclyffe, eds.:
 Erotic Interludes Vol. 2–5 
 Romantic Interludes Vol. 1–2 
 Breathless: Tales of Celebration 
 Women of the Dark Streets 
 Amor and More: Love Everafter 
 Myth & Magic: Queer Fairy Tales

Midnight Hunters Series (Writing as L.L. Raand)
 The Midnight Hunt
 Blood Hunt
 Night Hunt
 The Lone Hunt
 The Magic Hunt
 Shadow Hunt
Rogue Hunt
Enchanted Hunt

Edited Anthologies
 Best Lesbian Romance 2009
 Best Lesbian Romance 2010
 Best Lesbian Romance 2011
 Best Lesbian Romance 2012
 Best Lesbian Romance 2013
 Best Lesbian Romance 2014
 Best Lesbian Romance of the Year, Vol 1 (2015)
 In Deep Waters 1: Cruising the Seas
 In Deep Waters 2: Cruising the Strip
 OMG Queer

Video 
Radclyffe is featured in the documentary Love Between the Covers, "An entertaining and inspiring look into the billion-dollar romance fiction industry and its powerhouse of female writers and readers, a sisterhood that’s pioneering the digital revolution while finding fortune, fulfillment, and a global community." 

http://www.lovebetweenthecovers.com/

https://vimeo.com/ondemand/lovebetweenthecovers

References

External links 
Radfic Productions
Bold Strokes Books

1950 births
University at Albany, SUNY alumni
21st-century American novelists
American romantic fiction writers
American women novelists
Lambda Literary Award winners
LGBT people from New York (state)
Perelman School of Medicine at the University of Pennsylvania alumni
Living people
People from Provincetown, Massachusetts
People from Glens Falls, New York
People from Washington County, New York
People from Rensselaer County, New York
Women romantic fiction writers
21st-century American women writers
21st-century American short story writers
American publishers (people)
American lesbian writers
Novelists from New York (state)